The following is a list of the ground beetles recorded in Britain, organised by subfamily (-inae endings) and by tribe (-ini endings). For other beetle families, see the main list of beetle species recorded in Britain.

Cicindelinae Latreille, 1802

Cicindela campestris Linnaeus, 1758
Cicindela hybrida Linnaeus, 1758
Cicindela maritima Latreille & Dejean, 1822
Cicindela sylvatica Linnaeus, 1758
Cylindera germanica (Linnaeus, 1758)

Brachininae Bonelli, 1810
Brachinus crepitans (Linnaeus, 1758)
Brachinus sclopeta (Fabricius, 1792)

Omophroninae Bonelli, 1810
Omophron limbatum (Fabricius, 1777)

Carabinae Latreille, 1802

Carabini Latreille, 1802
Calosoma inquisitor (Linnaeus, 1758)
Calosoma sycophanta (Linnaeus, 1758)
Carabus clatratus Linnaeus, 1761
Carabus arvensis Herbst, 1784
Carabus granulatus Linnaeus, 1758
Carabus monilis Fabricius, 1792
Carabus nemoralis O. F. Müller, 1764
Carabus auratus Linnaeus, 1761
Carabus nitens Linnaeus, 1758
Carabus glabratus Paykull, 1790
Carabus problematicus Herbst, 1786
Carabus intricatus Linnaeus, 1761
Carabus violaceus Linnaeus, 1758
Cychrus caraboides (Linnaeus, 1758)
Nebriini Laporte, 1834
Leistus montanus Stephens, 1827
Leistus rufomarginatus (Duftschmid, 1812)
Leistus spinibarbis (Fabricius, 1775)
Leistus fulvibarbis Dejean, 1826
Leistus ferrugineus (Linnaeus, 1758)
Leistus terminatus (Hellwig in Panzer, 1793)
Nebria livida (Linnaeus, 1758)
Nebria brevicollis (Fabricius, 1792)
Nebria salina Fairmaire & Laboulbène, 1854
Nebria nivalis (Paykull, 1790)
Nebria rufescens (Ström, 1768)
Eurynebria complanata (Linnaeus, 1767)
Pelophila borealis (Paykull, 1790)
Notiophilini Motschulsky, 1850
Notiophilus aesthuans Motschulsky, 1864
Notiophilus aquaticus (Linnaeus, 1758)
Notiophilus biguttatus (Fabricius, 1779)
Notiophilus germinyi Fauvel, 1863
Notiophilus palustris (Duftschmid, 1812)
Notiophilus quadripunctatus Dejean, 1826
Notiophilus rufipes Curtis, 1829
Notiophilus substriatus G. R. Waterhouse, 1833
Elaphrini Latreille, 1802
Blethisa multipunctata (Linnaeus, 1758)
Elaphrus cupreus Duftschmid, 1812
Elaphrus lapponicus Gyllenhal, 1810
Elaphrus uliginosus Fabricius, 1792
Elaphrus riparius (Linnaeus, 1758)
Loricerini Bonelli, 1810
Loricera pilicornis (Fabricius, 1775)
Clivina collaris (Herbst, 1784)
Clivina fossor (Linnaeus, 1758)
Dyschirius angustatus (Ahrens, 1830)
Dyschirius obscurus (Gyllenhal, 1827)
Dyschirius thoracicus (Rossi, 1790)
Dyschirius aeneus (Dejean, 1825)
Dyschirius extensus Putzeys, 1846
Dyschirius globosus (Herbst, 1784)
Dyschirius impunctipennis Dawson, 1854
Dyschirius luedersi Wagner, 1915
Dyschirius nitidus (Dejean, 1825)
Dyschirius politus (Dejean, 1825)
Dyschirius salinus Schaum, 1843
Broscini Hope, 1838
Broscus cephalotes (Linnaeus, 1758)
Miscodera arctica (Paykull, 1798)
Trechini Bonelli, 1810
Perileptus areolatus (Creutzer, 1799)
Aepus marinus (Ström, 1783)
Aepus robinii (Laboulbène, 1849)
Trechus rivularis (Gyllenhal, 1810)
Trechus secalis (Paykull, 1790)
Trechus fulvus Dejean, 1831
Trechus obtusus Erichson, 1837
Trechus quadristriatus (Schrank, 1781)
Trechus rubens (Fabricius, 1792)
Trechus subnotatus Dejean, 1831
Thalassophilus longicornis (Sturm, 1825)
Blemus discus (Fabricius, 1792)
Trechoblemus micros (Herbst, 1784)
Tachys bistriatus (Duftschmid, 1812) ?
Tachys micros (Fischer von Waldheim, 1828)
Tachys obtusiusculus (Jeannel, 1941)
Tachys scutellaris Stephens, 1828
Elaphropus parvulus (Dejean, 1831)
Elaphropus walkerianus (Sharp, 1913)
Asaphidion curtum (Heyden, 1870)
Asaphidion flavipes (Linnaeus, 1761)
Asaphidion pallipes (Duftschmid, 1812)
Asaphidion stierlini (Heyden, 1880)
Ocys harpaloides (Audinet-Serville, 1821)
Ocys quinquestriatus (Gyllenhal, 1810)
Cillenus lateralis Samouelle, 1819
Bracteon argenteolum (Ahrens, 1812)
Bracteon litorale (Olivier, 1790)
Bembidion nigricorne Gyllenhal, 1827
Bembidion lampros (Herbst, 1784)
Bembidion properans (Stephens, 1828)
Bembidion punctulatum Drapiez, 1821
Bembidion pallidipenne (Illiger, 1802)
Bembidion bipunctatum (Linnaeus, 1761)
Bembidion dentellum (Thunberg, 1787)
Bembidion obliquum Sturm, 1825
Bembidion semipunctatum (Donovan, 1806)
Bembidion varium (Olivier, 1795)
Bembidion ephippium (Marsham, 1802)
Bembidion prasinum (Duftschmid, 1812)
Bembidion virens Gyllenhal, 1827
Bembidion atrocaeruleum (Stephens, 1828)
Bembidion caeruleum Audinet-Serville, 1826
Bembidion geniculatum Heer, 1837/8
Bembidion tibiale (Duftschmid, 1812)
Bembidion bruxellense Wesmael, 1835
Bembidion bualei Jacquelin du Val, 1852
Bembidion decorum (Zenker in Panzer, 1800)
Bembidion deletum Audinet-Serville, 1821
Bembidion femoratum Sturm, 1825
Bembidion fluviatile Dejean, 1831
Bembidion lunatum (Duftschmid, 1812)
Bembidion maritimum (Stephens, 1835)
Bembidion monticola Sturm, 1825
Bembidion saxatile Gyllenhal, 1827
Bembidion stephensii Crotch, 1866
Bembidion testaceum (Duftschmid, 1812)
Bembidion tetracolum Say, 1825
Bembidion illigeri Netolitzky, 1914
Bembidion stomoides Dejean, 1831
Bembidion inustum Jacquelin du Val, 1857
Bembidion nigropiceum (Marsham, 1802)
Bembidion gilvipes Sturm, 1825
Bembidion schuppelii Dejean, 1831
Bembidion assimile Gyllenhal, 1810
Bembidion clarkii (Dawson, 1849)
Bembidion fumigatum (Duftschmid, 1812)
Bembidion minimum (Fabricius, 1792)
Bembidion normannum Dejean, 1831
Bembidion humerale Sturm, 1825
Bembidion quadrimaculatum (Linnaeus, 1761)
Bembidion quadripustulatum Audinet-Serville, 1821
Bembidion doris (Panzer, 1796)
Bembidion articulatum (Panzer, 1795)
Bembidion octomaculatum (Goeze, 1777)
Bembidion obtusum Audinet-Serville, 1821
Bembidion aeneum Germar, 1824
Bembidion biguttatum (Fabricius, 1779)
Bembidion guttula (Fabricius, 1792)
Bembidion iricolor Bedel, 1879
Bembidion lunulatum (Geoffroy in Fourcroy, 1785)
Bembidion mannerheimii C. R. Sahlberg, 1827
Pogonus chalceus (Marsham, 1802)
Pogonus littoralis (Duftschmid, 1812)
Pogonus luridipennis (Germar, 1822)
Patrobini Kirby, 1837
Patrobus assimilis Chaudoir, 1844
Patrobus atrorufus (Ström, 1768)
Patrobus septentrionis Dejean, 1828
Pterostichini Bonelli, 1810
Stomis pumicatus (Panzer, 1795)
Poecilus cupreus (Linnaeus, 1758)
Poecilus kugelanni (Panzer, 1797)
Poecilus lepidus (Leske, 1785)
Poecilus versicolor (Sturm, 1824)
Pterostichus cristatus (Dufour, 1820)
Pterostichus aethiops (Panzer, 1796)
Pterostichus madidus (Fabricius, 1775)
Pterostichus longicollis (Duftschmid, 1812)
Pterostichus aterrimus (Herbst, 1784)
Pterostichus macer (Marsham, 1802)
Pterostichus niger (Schaller, 1783)
Pterostichus adstrictus Eschscholtz, 1823
Pterostichus oblongopunctatus (Fabricius, 1787)
Pterostichus quadrifoveolatus Letzner, 1852
Pterostichus melanarius (Illiger, 1798)
Pterostichus anthracinus (Panzer, 1795)
Pterostichus gracilis (Dejean, 1828)
Pterostichus minor (Gyllenhal, 1827)
Pterostichus nigrita (Paykull, 1790)
Pterostichus rhaeticus Heer, 1837/8
Pterostichus vernalis (Panzer, 1795)
Pterostichus diligens (Sturm, 1824)
Pterostichus strenuus (Panzer, 1796)
Abax parallelepipedus (Piller & Mitterpacher, 1783)
Abax parallelus (Duftschmid, 1812)
Sphodrini Laporte, 1834
Platyderus depressus (Audinet-Serville, 1821)
Synuchus vivalis (Illiger, 1798)
Calathus rotundicollis Dejean, 1828
Calathus ambiguus (Paykull, 1790)
Calathus cinctus Motschulsky, 1850
Calathus erratus (C. R. Sahlberg, 1827)
Calathus fuscipes (Goeze, 1777)
Calathus melanocephalus (Linnaeus, 1758)
Calathus micropterus (Duftschmid, 1812)
Calathus mollis (Marsham, 1802)
Sphodrus leucophthalmus (Linnaeus, 1758)
Laemostenus complanatus (Dejean, 1828)
Laemostenus terricola (Herbst, 1784)
Olisthopus rotundatus (Paykull, 1790)
Oxypselaphus obscurus (Herbst, 1784) ?
Paranchus albipes (Fabricius, 1796)
Anchomenus dorsalis (Pontoppidan, 1763)
Platynus assimilis (Paykull, 1790) ?
Batenus livens (Gyllenhal, 1810)
Sericoda quadripunctata (De Geer, 1774)
Agonum fuliginosum (Panzer, 1809)
Agonum gracile Sturm, 1824
Agonum micans Nicolai, 1822
Agonum piceum (Linnaeus, 1758)
Agonum scitulum Dejean, 1828
Agonum thoreyi Dejean, 1828
Agonum chalconotum Ménétriés, 1832
Agonum emarginatum (Gyllenhal, 1827)
Agonum ericeti (Panzer, 1809)
Agonum gracilipes (Duftschmid, 1812)
Agonum lugens (Duftschmid, 1812)
Agonum marginatum (Linnaeus, 1758)
Agonum muelleri (Herbst, 1784)
Agonum nigrum Dejean, 1828
Agonum sexpunctatum (Linnaeus, 1758)
Agonum versutum Sturm, 1824
Agonum viduum (Panzer, 1796)
Zabrus tenebrioides (Goeze, 1777)
Amara plebeja (Gyllenhal, 1810)
Amara strenua Zimmermann, 1832
Amara aenea (De Geer, 1774)
Amara anthobia Villa & Villa, 1833
Amara communis (Panzer, 1797)
Amara convexior Stephens, 1828
Amara curta Dejean, 1828
Amara eurynota (Panzer, 1796)
Amara famelica Zimmermann, 1832
Amara familiaris (Duftschmid, 1812)
Amara lucida (Duftschmid, 1812)
Amara lunicollis Schiødte, 1837
Amara montivaga Sturm, 1825
Amara nitida Sturm, 1825
Amara ovata (Fabricius, 1792)
Amara similata (Gyllenhal, 1810)
Amara spreta Dejean, 1831
Amara tibialis (Paykull, 1798)
Amara bifrons (Gyllenhal, 1810)
Amara cursitans (Zimmermann, 1832)
Amara fusca Dejean, 1828
Amara infima (Duftschmid, 1812)
Amara praetermissa (C. R. Sahlberg, 1827)
Amara quenseli (Schönherr, 1806)
Amara apricaria (Paykull, 1790)
Amara consularis (Duftschmid, 1812)
Amara fulva (O. F. Müller, 1776)
Amara equestris (Duftschmid, 1812)
Curtonotus alpinus (Paykull, 1790)
Curtonotus aulicus (Panzer, 1796)
Curtonotus convexiusculus (Marsham, 1802)
Harpalini Bonelli, 1810
Harpalus calceatus (Duftschmid, 1812)
Harpalus griseus (Panzer, 1797)
Harpalus rufipes (De Geer, 1774)
Harpalus affinis (Schrank, 1781)
Harpalus anxius (Duftschmid, 1812)
Harpalus attenuatus Stephens, 1828
Harpalus cupreus Dejean, 1829
Harpalus dimidiatus (Rossi, 1790)
Harpalus froelichii Sturm, 1818
Harpalus honestus (Duftschmid, 1812)
Harpalus laevipes Zetterstedt, 1828
Harpalus latus (Linnaeus, 1758)
Harpalus neglectus Audinet-Serville, 1821
Harpalus pumilus Sturm, 1818
Harpalus rubripes (Duftschmid, 1812)
Harpalus rufipalpis Sturm, 1818
Harpalus serripes (Quensel in Schönherr, 1806)
Harpalus servus (Duftschmid, 1812)
Harpalus smaragdinus (Duftschmid, 1812)
Harpalus tardus (Panzer, 1796)
Harpalus melancholicus Dejean, 1829
Harpalus tenebrosus Dejean, 1829
Ophonus ardosiacus Lutshnik, 1922
Ophonus azureus (Fabricius, 1775)
Ophonus sabulicola (Panzer, 1796)
Ophonus stictus Stephens, 1828
Ophonus cordatus (Duftschmid, 1812)
Ophonus laticollis Mannerheim, 1825
Ophonus melletii (Heer, 1837/8)
Ophonus parallelus (Dejean, 1829)
Ophonus puncticeps Stephens, 1828
Ophonus puncticollis (Paykull, 1798)
Ophonus rufibarbis (Fabricius, 1792)
Ophonus rupicola (Sturm, 1818)
Ophonus schaubergerianus (Puel, 1937)
Ophonus subsinuatus Rey, 1886
Anisodactylus binotatus (Fabricius, 1787)
Anisodactylus nemorivagus (Duftschmid, 1812)
Anisodactylus poeciloides (Stephens, 1828)
Diachromus germanus (Linnaeus, 1758)
Scybalicus oblongiusculus (Dejean, 1829)
Dicheirotrichus gustavii Crotch, 1871
Dicheirotrichus obsoletus (Dejean, 1829)
Trichocellus cognatus (Gyllenhal, 1827)
Trichocellus placidus (Gyllenhal, 1827)
Bradycellus caucasicus (Chaudoir, 1846)
Bradycellus csikii Laczó, 1912
Bradycellus distinctus (Dejean, 1829)
Bradycellus harpalinus (Audinet-Serville, 1821)
Bradycellus ruficollis (Stephens, 1828)
Bradycellus sharpi Joy, 1912
Bradycellus verbasci (Duftschmid, 1812)
Stenolophus comma (Fabricius, 1775)
Stenolophus mixtus (Herbst, 1784)
Stenolophus skrimshiranus Stephens, 1828
Stenolophus teutonus (Schrank, 1781)
Acupalpus brunnipes (Sturm, 1825)
Acupalpus dubius Schilsky, 1888
Acupalpus elegans (Dejean, 1829)
Acupalpus exiguus Dejean, 1829
Acupalpus flavicollis (Sturm, 1825)
Acupalpus maculatus (Schaum, 1860)
Acupalpus meridianus (Linnaeus, 1761)
Acupalpus parvulus (Sturm, 1825)
Anthracus consputus (Duftschmid, 1812)
Chlaenius nigricornis (Fabricius, 1787)
Chlaenius nitidulus (Schrank, 1781)
Chlaenius tristis (Schaller, 1783)
Chlaenius vestitus (Paykull, 1790)
Callistus lunatus (Fabricius, 1775)
Oodini LaFerté-Sénectère, 1851
Oodes helopioides (Fabricius, 1792)
Licinini Bonelli, 1810
Licinus depressus (Paykull, 1790)
Licinus punctatulus (Fabricius, 1792)
Badister bullatus (Schrank, 1798)
Badister meridionalis Puel, 1925
Badister unipustulatus Bonelli, 1813
Badister sodalis (Duftschmid, 1812)
Badister collaris Motschulsky, 1844
Badister dilatatus Chaudoir, 1837
Badister peltatus (Panzer, 1797)
Panagaeini Bonelli, 1810
Panagaeus bipustulatus (Fabricius, 1775)
Panagaeus cruxmajor (Linnaeus, 1758)
Perigonini Horn, 1881
Perigona nigriceps (Dejean, 1831)
Masoreini Chaudoir, 1870
Masoreus wetterhallii (Gyllenhal, 1813)
Lebia chlorocephala (J. Hoffmann, 1803)
Lebia cyanocephala (Linnaeus, 1758)
Lebia cruxminor (Linnaeus, 1758)
Lebia marginata (Geoffroy in Fourcroy, 1785)
Lebia scapularis (Geoffroy in Fourcroy, 1785)
Demetrias imperialis (Germar, 1824)
Demetrias atricapillus (Linnaeus, 1758)
Demetrias monostigma Samouelle, 1819
Cymindis axillaris (Fabricius, 1794)
Cymindis macularis Mannerheim in Fischer von Waldheim, 1824
Cymindis vaporariorum (Linnaeus, 1758)
Paradromius linearis (Olivier, 1795)
Paradromius longiceps (Dejean, 1826)
Dromius agilis (Fabricius, 1787)
Dromius angustus Brullé, 1834
Dromius meridionalis Dejean, 1825
Dromius quadrimaculatus (Linnaeus, 1758)
Calodromius spilotus (Illiger, 1798)
Philorhizus melanocephalus (Dejean, 1825)
Philorhizus notatus (Stephens, 1827)
Philorhizus quadrisignatus (Dejean, 1825)
Philorhizus sigma (Rossi, 1790)
Philorhizus vectensis (Rye, 1873)
Microlestes maurus (Sturm, 1827)
Microlestes minutulus (Goeze, 1777)
Lionychus quadrillum (Duftschmid, 1812)
Syntomus foveatus (Geoffroy in Fourcroy, 1785)
Syntomus obscuroguttatus (Duftschmid, 1812)
Syntomus truncatellus (Linnaeus, 1761)
Odacanthini Laporte, 1834
Odacantha melanura (Linnaeus, 1767)
Dryptini Schaum, 1857
Drypta dentata (Rossi, 1790)
Polistichus connexus (Geoffroy in Fourcroy, 1785)

References

Ground beetles
 List, Britain